The Camp Pilot Knob was a sub camp of the US Army, Desert Training Center in Imperial County, California. The main headquarters for the Desert Training Center was Camp Young, this is where General Patton's 3rd Armored Division was stationed. Camp Pilot Knob was designated a California Historic Landmark (No.985).  Camp Pilot Knob is near Felicity, California, in Imperial County, California. Camp Pilot Knob is 2 miles north of the US-Mexico border, just north of the now Interstate 8. The camp is five miles northwest of Yuma, Arizona and 2 miles west of the Colorado river. The camp was built just north of the Felicity train station, which was used to bring the troops and supplies to the camp. The camp is named after a hill south of the camp.

History

Camp Pilot Knob was built in April 1943. The Camp Pilot Knob was built to prepare troops to do battle in Europe to fight the Nazis during World War II.  When completed the camp had shower buildings, latrines, wooden tent frames, water storage tanks and a water treatment plant. North of the camp were a number of fire ranges for training Troops. The camp was closed in June 1944. Trained at the camp from June 1943 to August 1943 was the 85th Infantry Division. From the camp the 85th was moved to Italy to fight Nazis. The 6th Infantry  Division trained at the camp, they departed to fight in the New Guinea campaign and the Battle of Luzon. Also trained at the camp was the 36th Reconnaissance Squadron and 44th Reconnaissance Squadron. To both train and server the troop the 54th Evacuation Hospital operated at the camp.

Marker
Marker 985 at the Camp Pilot Knob site reads: 
 Erected 1990 by State Department of Parks and Recreation in cooperation with the Bureau of Land Management and John P. Squibob Chapter No. 1853, E Clampus Vitus. (Marker Number 985.)

See also
California Historical Landmarks in Imperial County
California Historical Landmarks in San Bernardino County, California
California Historical Landmarks in Riverside County, California
Camp Granite
Camp Iron Mountain
 Camp Clipper and Camp Essex
 Camp Ibis
California during World War II

External links
Training Center Boogie - Sony by John Malcolm Penn, song about : Desert training camps

References

California Historical Landmarks
1942 establishments in California